The 2019–20 Welsh League Cup (known for sponsorship purposes as The Nathaniel MG Cup) was the 28th season of the Welsh League cup competition, which was established in 1992.

Played under a regionalised, knock-out format, the competition is the sixth to be held since the tournament was expanded to include clubs from outside the Cymru Premier. As well as the 12 Cymru Premier clubs from the previous season, every team from the Cymru North and the Cymru South and the wildcard Berriew from the Mid Wales Football League entered. The Premier league teams and the two sides relegated from the top flight, plus the 2nd and 3rd placed teams in each respective Tier 2 league have a bye into the Second Round.

First round

The draw for this round was made on 3 July 2019. On 30 July it was announced that match between Conwy and Bangor would be postponed until further notice pending the outcome of an independent arbitration hearing between Bangor and the Football Association of Wales. The other fixtures were played on the weekend of 2–4 August. Bangor against Conwy was eventually played on 4 September.

North

|-

|}

South

|-

|}

Second round

The draw for this round was made along with the draw for the previous on 3 July 2019. The matches were played on 9 and 10 August. Bangor City's match against The New Saints was played on 24 September.

North

|-

|}

South

|-

|}

Third round

Six of the matches were played on 23 and 24 September. SMT vs Haverfordwest was played on 2 October and Bala vs Bangor City was played on 8 October. Defending champions Cardiff Met. were eliminated at this stage.

|-

|}

Quarter-final

The four ties for the quarter finals were played on 29 October 2019.

|-

|}

Semi-final 
Both ties in the semi finals were played on 23 November 2019.

|-

|-

|}

Final 
The final was played on 1 February 2020.

|-

|}

Welsh League Cup seasons
League Cup
Wales